Puella Mea is a poem by E. E. Cummings.  It is notable as his longest poem, at 290 lines.  The title is Latin and translates as "My Girl", referring to Elaine Orr Thayer, his first wife, and the mother of his only child, Nancy Thayer Andrews. Von Abele considers the poem to be a departure point for the poet from the "witty romanticism" of his early works.

Puella Mea, a very early Cummings' poem, was first published in the January 1921 issue of The Dial, and then in Tulips and Chimneys, Cummings's first collection of poetry.  In 1949 it was published as a separate book by Golden Eagle Press.  The book featured illustrations by Cummings, Paul Klee, Amedeo Modigliani, Pablo Picasso, and Kurt Roesch.

Title and content 
The title refers to Catullus 3 that reiterates the words in a less conventional order (meae puellae). The change of word order possibly signifies a distant recollection or is simply an attempt to make the title "more Latin", adding "a certain air of eleganoe" that is missing in more boring "My Girl". The poem does not sound at all like Catullus; Baker characterizes it as a blend of Romance and the Song of Solomon, pointing, however, to the line "Eater of all things lovely - Time!" that mimics line 14 of Catullus 3 while substituting Time for Catullus' "Shades of Orcus."

The poem highlights the contrast between the living beauty of Cummings' lady and the now-dead female ideals of the writers of the times past. First four lines sum up the remaining text:
Harun Omar and Master Hafiz
keep your dead beautiful ladies.
Mine is a little lovelier
than any of your ladies were

Criticism 
Breen suggests that, excluding the overabundance of "concrete sensuousness of physical detail", there is little to note in this "juvenile in theme" poem. Von Abele, on the contrary, describes the poem as "a delightful piece" where historical allusions to Salome, Tristram, Bagdad, Chaucer, and Semiramis maintain the distance between the physical body of the girl being praised and the reader, with the latter prevented from visualizing the core of the presentation,
... her large and shapely thighs
in whose dome the trembling bliss
of a kingdom wholly is ...
through the use of "playful euphuism", commonly found in the English love poetry.

External links

 A Disappearing Poet of Always, Oxford Dictionaries article discussing this poem
 First book edition with illustrations (Project Gutenberg)

References

Sources 
  
 
 
 
 
  
 

American poems
1921 poems
Poetry by E. E. Cummings
Works originally published in The Dial
Modernist poems